Michael Lira (born July 16, 1997) is a Peruvian-American professional stock car racing driver.

Early life and early career
Lira was born in Daytona Beach, Florida (Volusia County). He began his motorsports career racing quarter-midgets at Little New Smyrna Speedway, in New Smyrna Beach, Florida. When he turned 12, Lira started racing in the FASCAR Pro Trucks Series. When he was 15, he competed in both the FASCAR Pro Truck and Florida United Pro Truck Series. He was the 2012 New Smyrna Speedway Pro-Trucks Track Champion, and he tied for the Pro-Truck Track Championship at Orlando Speedworld.

ARCA Racing Series
Lira began competing in the ARCA Racing Series in 2013, at the age of 16. He drove for Kimmel Racing, making his debut at Berlin Raceway on August 10. Lira competed in a total of four races with Kimmel Racing in 2013, and another 11 races with the team in 2014. His best finish in those two years was 7th at Salem Speedway. His best qualifying effort in those two years was 4th at Pocono Raceway.

Although not permitted to race in events at tracks over one mile in length due to track age restrictions, Before his 18th birthday, Lira participated in multiple ARCA Racing Series test sessions at Daytona International Speedway and one test at Talladega Superspeedway.

Switching to his family owned team of Lira Motorsports in 2015, Lira plans on competing in 16 of the 20 races on the ARCA Racing Series schedule. Age restrictions do not allow him to race at 4 of the tracks that have races scheduled before his 18th birthday. Through the first 10 races of the year, Lira's best finish was 8th at Mobile International Speedway, and he qualified 4th at three different tracks (Nashville Speedway, Toledo Speedway and New Jersey Motorsports Park).

IMSA and SCCA road course racing 
Lira competed in a Sports Car Club of America (SCCA) road-course event at Daytona International Speedway in May 2014. In his first official SCCA start, he finished 8th overall and 4th in class.

In January 2015, Lira made his International Motor Sports Association (IMSA) Tudor United SportsCar Championship debut in the Rolex 24 at Daytona International Speedway driving for Muehlner Motorsports America. The car suffered from mechanical issues during the race and was brought to the garage four separate times for more than eight hours of race time. The car finished 17th in the Daytona-GTD Class.

Also in January 2015, Lira competed in the IMSA Continental Tire SportsCar Challenge BMW Performance 200 at Daytona International Speedway. In that race he started 8th and finished 13th. He competed in a second IMSA Continental Tire SportsCar Challenge event, the Monterey Grand Prix at Mazda Raceway Laguna Seca, in May 2015. In that race, he started 15th and finished 14th with co-driver Nick Galante. Michael's third and final IMSA Continental Tire SportsCar Challenge race of 2015 was at Road Atlanta on October 2. In that race, Lira finished 10th along with co-driver David Levine.

Family
Lira's father, Carlos Lira, is an accomplished sports car racer. He has been racing since the age of 18. He has earned five national championships in SCCA Ford Mustang road course competition. He also has experience in Grand Am, Rolex Sports Car Series and Pirelli World Challenge competition. Carlos Lira is a native of Lima, Peru.

Motorsports career results

NASCAR
(key) (Bold – Pole position awarded by qualifying time. Italics – Pole position earned by points standings or practice time. * – Most laps led.)

Xfinity Series

 Season still in progress
 Ineligible for series points

ARCA Racing Series
(key) (Bold – Pole position awarded by qualifying time. Italics – Pole position earned by points standings or practice time. * – Most laps led.)

ARCA Menards Series East

References

External links
 

1997 births
Living people
Racing drivers from Florida
ARCA Menards Series drivers
NASCAR drivers
Sportspeople from Daytona Beach, Florida
Michelin Pilot Challenge drivers